Jan Veenhof (born 28 January 1969) is a Dutch former footballer who played as a defender.

Career
Born in Friesland, Veenhof began playing football with local side FC Groningen before joining clubs in Japan, Albania and Canada. After three seasons playing for Omiya Ardija in Japan, he had brief spells with FC Den Bosch and KF Tirana. Shortly after he left Albania, Veenhof signed for A-League side Toronto Lynx in 2003.

Club statistics

References

External links

VI.nl

1969 births
Living people
Footballers from Leeuwarden
Association football defenders
Dutch footballers
FC Groningen players
Omiya Ardija players
FC Den Bosch players
KF Tirana players
Toronto Lynx players
SC Veendam players
Eredivisie players
Eerste Divisie players
J2 League players
Japan Football League (1992–1998) players
A-League (1995–2004) players
Kategoria Superiore players
Dutch expatriate footballers
Expatriate footballers in Japan
Dutch expatriate sportspeople in Japan
Expatriate footballers in Albania
Dutch expatriate sportspeople in Albania
Expatriate soccer players in Canada
Dutch expatriate sportspeople in Canada